Denis Gojko (born 16 February 1998) is a Polish professional footballer who plays as a right winger for Skra Częstochowa.

Career
Gojko was loaned out to Stal Mielec on 21 December 2018 for the rest of the season.

Honours

Club
Piast Gliwice
Ekstraklasa: 2018–19

References

External links

1998 births
Living people
Polish footballers
Poland youth international footballers
Association football midfielders
Piast Gliwice players
Stal Mielec players
Wigry Suwałki players
Olimpia Grudziądz players
Skra Częstochowa players
Ekstraklasa players
I liga players
II liga players
III liga players
Sportspeople from Gliwice